Adalbert II may refer to:
Adalbert II, Margrave of Tuscany (c.875-915)
Adalbert II (archbishop of Salzburg) (died 935)
Adalbert II, Count of Ballenstedt (died 1076/83)
Adalbert II (archbishop of Mainz) (died 1141)